Events from the year 1996 in the United States.

Incumbents

Federal government 
 President: Bill Clinton (D–Arkansas)
 Vice President: Al Gore (D–Tennessee)
 Chief Justice: William Rehnquist (Wisconsin) 
 Speaker of the House of Representatives: Newt Gingrich  (R–Georgia)
 Senate Majority Leader: Bob Dole (R–Kansas) (until June 12), Trent Lott (R–Mississippi) (starting June 12)
 Congress: 104th

Events

January

 January 2 – Philadelphia police officer Lauretha Vaird is shot and later pronounced dead during a botched armed bank robbery by rapper Cool C. She becomes Philadelphia's first female police officer killed in the line of duty.
 January 7 – One of the worst blizzards in American history hits the eastern states, killing more than 150 people. Philadelphia receives a record 30 inches of snowfall and New York City's public schools close for the first time in 18 years. The federal government in Washington, D.C. is closed for several days, extending the time federal employees are out of the office from the 1996 federal government shutdown.
 January 19 – The North Cape oil spill occurs as an engine fire forces the tugboat Scandia ashore on Moonstone Beach in South Kingstown, Rhode Island. The North Cape barge is pulled along with it and leaks 820,000 gallons of home heating oil.
 January 23 – State of the Union Address.
 January 26
 Whitewater scandal: U.S. First Lady Hillary Clinton testifies before a grand jury.
 Millionaire philanthropist John Eleuthère du Pont shoots dead his protégé, Olympic wrestler Dave Schultz, at Foxcatcher Farm.
 January 28 – Super Bowl XXX: The Dallas Cowboys become the first NFL franchise to win 3 Super Bowls in a span of 4 seasons, as they defeat the Pittsburgh Steelers 27–17 at Sun Devil Stadium in Tempe, Arizona. It is the Cowboys' fifth Super Bowl championship.

February
 February 1 – Sundance Channel debuts.
 February 2 – Frontier Middle School shooting: A gunman kills his algebra teacher and two other students in Moses Lake, Washington.
 February 6 – 1996 Honolulu hostage crisis: A gunman takes hostages at his former place of employment in Honolulu, Hawaii.
 February 15 – The U.S. Embassy in Athens, Greece comes under mortar fire.
 February 16 – 1996 Maryland train collision: A Chicago-bound Amtrak train, the Capitol Limited, collides with a MARC commuter train bound for Washington, D.C., killing 11 people.
 February 17 – In Philadelphia, Garry Kasparov beats "Deep Blue" in a second chess match.
 February 24 – Cuban fighter jets shoot down two American aircraft belonging to the Cuban exile group Brothers to the Rescue. Cuban officials assert that they invaded Cuban airspace.
 February 29 – In Lumberton, North Carolina, Daniel Green is convicted of the murder of James Jordan, the father of basketball star Michael Jordan.

March
 March 4 – DISH Network, a Direct Broadcast Satellite service, begins as a service of EchoStar.
 March 8 – The People's Republic of China begins surface-to-surface missile testing and military exercises off Taiwanese coastal areas. The United States government condemns the act as provocation, and the Taiwanese government warns of retaliation.
 March 10 – In Mesquite, Nevada, motorcycle stunt rider Butch Laswell is killed in front of a crowd of spectators, after a motorcycle stunt goes horribly wrong.
 March 19 – In Los Angeles, Lyle and Erik Menendez are found guilty of first-degree murder for the shotgun killing of their parents.
 March 25
 An 81-day-long standoff begins between anti-government Freemen and federal officers in Jordan, Montana.
 The 68th Academy Awards, hosted by Whoopi Goldberg, are held at Dorothy Chandler Pavilion in Los Angeles, with Mel Gibson's Braveheart winning five awards out of ten nominations, including Best Picture and Best Director. The telecast garners over 44.8 million viewers.
 March 30 – After being convicted of the murder of Colleen Slemmer in Tennessee, 20-year-old Christa Pike becomes the youngest woman to be sentenced to death in the United States during the post-Furman period.

April

 April 3
 A Boeing 737 military jet crashes into a mountain north of Dubrovnik, Croatia. All 35 people on board die, including United States Secretary of Commerce Ron Brown (see 1996 Croatia USAF CT-43 crash).
 Suspected "Unabomber" Theodore Kaczynski is arrested at his Montana cabin.
 April 9 – President Bill Clinton signs the Line Item Veto Act of 1996, granting the U.S. president line-item veto power. Just over two years later, in the case of Clinton v. City of New York, 524 U.S. 417 (1998), the Supreme Court of the United States would rule that the law is unconstitutional.
 April 11 – Jessica Dubroff, 7, is killed in a plane crash in Cheyenne, Wyoming while attempting to set a record as the youngest person to pilot an airplane across the United States.
 April 16 – The NBA's 1995–1996 Chicago Bulls, with Michael Jordan's lead, go on to set a new NBA record for the most wins in a season, achieving their 70th win.
 April 24 – President Bill Clinton signs the Antiterrorism and Effective Death Penalty Act of 1996 into law.
 April 29 – The Broadway hit Rent opens at the Nederlander Theatre.

May
 May 8 – The Keck II telescope is dedicated in Hawaii.
 May 11 – After takeoff from Miami, Florida, a fire started by improperly handled oxygen canisters in the cargo hold of Atlanta-bound ValuJet Flight 592, causes the Douglas DC-9 to crash in the Florida Everglades, killing all 110 on board.
 May 20 – Gay rights – Romer v. Evans: The Supreme Court of the United States rules against a law that prevents any city, town or county in the state of Colorado from taking any legislative, executive, or judicial action to protect the rights of homosexuals.
 May 30 – The Hoover Institution releases an optimistic report that global warming will probably reduce mortality in the United States and provide Americans with valuable benefits.

June

 June – Iraq disarmament crisis: As Iraq continues to refuse inspectors access to a number of sites, the U.S. fails in its attempt to build support for military action against Iraq in the UN Security Council.
 June 10 – The Colorado Avalanche wins their first Stanley Cup in their first season based out of Denver, Colorado, defeating the Florida Panthers 4 games to none. Avalanche captain Joe Sakic wins the Conn Smythe Trophy as playoff MVP.
 June 12 – In Philadelphia, a panel of federal judges blocks a law against indecency on the internet. The panel says that the 1996 Communications Decency Act would infringe upon the free speech rights of adults.
 June 13 – An 81-day standoff between the Montana Freemen and FBI agents ends with their surrender in Montana.
 June 16 – The Chicago Bulls win their fourth NBA Championship by defeating the Seattle SuperSonics in the best-of-7 series 4 games to 2.
 June 20 – The last fourth-generation Chevrolet Corvette rolls off the assembly line at the GM Assembly Plant in Bowling Green, Kentucky.
 June 21 – Walt Disney Pictures' 34th feature film, The Hunchback of Notre Dame, considered to be one of the studio's darkest animated films, is released to positive reviews and commercial success.
 June 25 – The Khobar Towers bombing in Saudi Arabia kills 19 U.S. servicemen and one Saudi local.

July
 July 12 – Hurricane Bertha makes landfall in North Carolina as a Category 2 storm, causing $270 million in damage to the United States and its possessions and many indirect deaths.
 July 17 – Paris and Rome-bound TWA Flight 800 (Boeing 747) explodes off the coast of Long Island, New York, killing all 230 on board.
 July 19 – The 1996 Summer Olympics in Atlanta begin.
 July 27 – The Centennial Olympic Park bombing at the 1996 Summer Olympics kills 2 and injures 111.
 July 29 – The child protection portion of the Communications Decency Act (1996) is struck down as "too broad" by a U.S. federal court.

August
 August – The unemployment rate drops to 5.1%, the lowest since March 1989, which saw the lowest rate of the previous business cycle.
 August 1 – Michael Johnson wins the 200m finals of 1996 Summer Olympics in Atlanta in a world-record time of 19.32 seconds.
 August 6 – NASA announces that the Allan Hills 84001 meteorite, thought to originate from Mars, may contain evidence of primitive life-forms; further tests are inconclusive.
 August 15 – Bob Dole is nominated for President of the United States, and Jack Kemp for vice president, at the Republican National Convention in San Diego, California.
August 16 – Binti Jua, a gorilla, saves a three-year-old boy who fell into the 20 foot (6.1 m) deep gorilla enclosure at Brookfield Zoo, Chicago.
August 19 – The invasive species Asian long-horned beetle is found in New York.
 August 21 – President Bill Clinton signs the War Crimes Act of 1996 into law.
 August 22 – President Clinton signs the landmark Personal Responsibility and Work Opportunity Reconciliation Act into law.
 August 23 – Osama bin Laden writes "The Declaration of Jihad on the Americans Occupying the Country of the Two Sacred Places," a call for the removal of American military forces from Saudi Arabia.
 August 24 – Gabe Newell and Mike Harrington found the Valve Corporation.
 August 26
 During the 1996 Democratic National Convention, Civil Rights Movement historian Randy Kryn and 10 others are arrested by the Federal Protective Service while protesting in a demonstration at the Kluczynski Federal Building in downtown Chicago.
 August 29
 Tiger Woods makes his professional PGA Tour debut at the Greater Milwaukee Open, four days after winning his third consecutive U.S. Amateur Championship.
 U.S. President Bill Clinton and Vice President Al Gore are re-nominated at the Democratic National Convention in Chicago.
 August 31 – The Big 12 Conference is inaugurated with a football game between Kansas State University and Texas Tech University in Manhattan, Kansas.

September

 September 3
 Iraq disarmament crisis: As Iraq continues to refuse inspectors access to a number of sites, the U.S. fails in its attempt to build support for military action against Iraq in the UN Security Council.
 The U.S. launches Operation Desert Strike against Iraq in reaction to the attack on Arbil in Iraqi Kurdistan.
 September 5 – Hurricane Fran makes landfall near Cape Fear, North Carolina as a Category 3 storm with sustained winds of 115 mph, just weeks prior to the landfall of Hurricane Bertha near the same location. It caused $3.2 billion in damages and claimed a total of 27 lives.
 September 7 – Rapper Tupac Shakur is critically wounded in a drive-by shooting while cruising the Las Vegas Strip with Suge Knight. Shakur is rushed to UMC Medical Center and placed on life support.
 September 8 – Blue's Clues premieres on Nick Jr.
 September 12 – 21-year-old Ricardo López commits suicide in his apartment in Hollywood, Florida, after mailing a letter bomb to singer Björk's home in London. He recorded his own suicide using a VHS camera.
 September 13 – 25-year-old rapper Tupac Shakur dies after being critically wounded in a drive-by shooting six days earlier on September 7, following his attendance at the Mike Tyson – Bruce Seldon boxing match at the MGM Grand Las Vegas in Paradise, Nevada.
 September 14 – The U.S. wins the inaugural 1996 World Cup of Hockey by defeating Canada.
 September 16 – Ricardo López is found dead in his apartment by Hollywood Police after reports of a foul odor in the room. After watching his suicide tape, police contact Scotland Yard to warn them about an explosive package on its way to Björk's home in London. London Metro Police Officers intercept the package and safely detonate it, leaving Björk unharmed.
 September 24 – U.S. President Bill Clinton signs the Comprehensive Nuclear-Test-Ban Treaty at the United Nations.
 September 29 – Nintendo releases the Nintendo 64 in North America.

October
 October 1 – Animal Planet and Discovery Civilization are launched.
 October 2 – The Electronic Freedom of Information Act Amendments are signed by U.S. President Bill Clinton.
 October 4 – Discovery Science debuts.
 October 6 – Jim Lehrer hosts the first presidential debate between Bob Dole and President Clinton.
 October 7
 The Fox News Channel is launched on U.S. cable systems.
 The popular children's TV series, Arthur, debuts on PBS Kids.
 October 7–November 5 — At least sixty-six people become sick and one baby dies as a result of drinking apple juice infected with E. coli.
 October 9 – Al Gore and Jack Kemp participate in the 1996 vice presidential debate in Florida.
 October 14 – The Dow Jones Industrial Average gains 40.62 to close at 6,010.00, the Dow's first close above 6,000.
 October 16 – The final presidential debate of the 1996 election takes place at the University of San Diego.
 October 26 – The New York Yankees defeat the Atlanta Braves to win their first World Series in 18 years.

November

 November 5 – U.S. presidential election, 1996: Democratic incumbent Bill Clinton defeats Republican challenger Bob Dole to win his second term. This election had the lowest voter turnout since 1924.
 November 7 – NASA launches the Mars Global Surveyor.
 November 11 – Discovery Kids debuts.
 November 15 
 State Street in Chicago is re-opened to pedestrian traffic after a revitalization project.
 Space Jam, directed by Joe Pytka, is released in theaters.
 November 16 – Mother Teresa receives honorary U.S. citizenship.
 November 19 – STS-80: Space Shuttle Columbia conducts the longest mission of the Space Shuttle program.
 November 21 – A propane explosion at the Humberto Vidal shoe store and office building in San Juan, Puerto Rico kills 33.
 November 25
 An ice storm strikes the U.S., killing 26 directly and hundreds more from accidents.
 The U.S. stock market, especially the Dow Jones Industrial Average, gains at an incredibly fast pace following the 1996 Presidential election. It gains 10 days in a row during the month.
 November 26 – The Sands Hotel in Las Vegas is imploded to make way for the Venetian Hotel.
 November – CrossLink International is founded.

December

 December 6 – The General Motors EV1, the first production electric car of the modern era, is launched and becomes available for lease.
 December 20 – Steve Jobs' company NeXT is bought by Apple Computer, the company co-founded by Jobs.
 December 25 (probable date) – Death of JonBenét Ramsey: A six-year-old beauty queen is beaten and strangled in the basement of her family's home in Boulder, Colorado; her body is found the following day.
 December 31
 The Atchison, Topeka and Santa Fe Railway is merged with the Burlington Northern Railroad to form the BNSF Railway, making it one of the largest railroad mergers in U.S. history.
 The Hacienda resort on the Las Vegas Strip is imploded to make way for the Mandalay Bay.
Laurel Mountain (Oregon) receives  of rainfall equivalent during the year, the most ever recorded for a calendar year in the contiguous United States.

Ongoing
 Iraqi no-fly zones (1991–2003)
 Dot-com bubble (–)

Births

January 

 January 1 – Stunna 4 Vegas, rapper
 January 2 – Dior Hall, hurdler
 January 5 – Tyler Ulis, basketball player
 January 8 – Khylin Rhambo, actor
 January 9 – Oana Gregory, Romanian-American actress
 January 10 – Curren Caples, skateboarder
 January 15 – Dove Cameron, actress
 January 18
 Carolena Carstens, taekwondo practitioner
 Sarah Gilman, actress
 Alex Scott, cancer charity founder (died 2004)
 January 21 – Jorge Lendeborg Jr., Dominican-born actor
 January 22 – Sami Gayle, actress
 January 23 – Chachi Gonzales, dancer, choreographer and actress
 January 27
 Braeden Lemasters, actor and musician
 Caitlin Sanchez, actress
 Trenton Thompson, American football player
 January 31 – Joel Courtney, actor
 January 28 – Emily Piriz, singer

February

 February 3
 Taylor Caniff, internet personality
 Alex Ko, actor, dancer and singer
 February 5 – Matt Watson, youtuber
 February 6 – Dalton Rapattoni, singer
 February 7 
 David Castro, actor
 Jake Goldberg, actor
 February 8 – Isadora Williams, figure skater
 February 9
 Jimmy Bennett, actor and musician
 Kelli Berglund, actress and dancer
 February 13 – Catherine Bouwkamp, wheelchair fencer
 February 16 – Jimmy Pinchak, actor
 February 17 – Sasha Pieterse, African-born actress
 February 23
 Michael Johnston, actor
 D'Angelo Russell, basketball player
 February 24 – Quinn Carpenter, ice dancer
 February 25 – Elijah McClain, African-American who died after a police encounter (died 2019)
 February 28 – Bobb'e J. Thompson, actor

March 

 March 1 – Sage Northcutt, mixed martial artist
 March 4 – Brenna Dowell, artistic gymnast
 March 6 – Dillon Freasier, child actor
 March 5 – Kyle Kaiser, racing driver
 March 6 – Savannah Stehlin, actress
 March 10 – Mia Rose Frampton, actress
 March 15 – Maxwell Jacob Friedman, pro wrestler
 March 17 – Saeed Blacknall, wide receiver
 March 18 – Madeline Carroll, actress
 March 29 – Wade Baldwin IV, basketball player
 March 31 – Liza Koshy, YouTuber

April 

 April 3 – Jackson Bond, actor
 April 4 – Austin Mahone, singer
 April 6 – VikkiKitty, esports commentator
 April 9 - Emerson Hyndman, footballer
 April 10
 Austin Kafentzis, football quarterback
 Mattie Liptak, actor 
 Logan Tucker, murder victim (d. 2002)
 Audrey Whitby, teen actress 
 April 11 – Jake Browning, American football player
 April 14 – Abigail Breslin, actress
 April 16
 Anya Taylor-Joy, actress
 Taylor Townsend, tennis player
 April 17 – Dee Dee Davis, actress
 April 18 – Ski Mask the Slump God, American rapper
 April 19 – Sam Woolf, singer
 April 21 – Tavi Gevinson, blogger
 April 24 – D'Onta Foreman, American football player
 April 25 – Allisyn Ashley Arm, actress
 April 28 – Tony Revolori, actor

May 

 May 3
 Mary C. Cain, track and field athlete
 Arden Key, American footballer
 Domantas Sabonis, basketball player
 Noah Munck, actor
 May 4 – Arielle Gold, snowboarder
 May 5 
 Jax, singer
 David Sills, American footballer
 Britney Simpson, pair skater
 May 6 – Dominic Scott Kay, actor
 May 8 – 6ix9ine, rapper
 May 9
 Noah Centineo, actor
 Collins Key, magician
 Mary Mouser, actress
 May 10 – SypherPK, youtuber and twitch streamer
 May 14
 McKaley Miller, actress
 TheOdd1sOut, animator
 May 17 – Ryan Ochoa, actor
 May 18 – Violett Beane, actress
 May 20 – Michael Brown, African-American teen killed by the Ferguson Police Department
 May 19 – Blocboy JB, rapper
 May 21 – Josh Allen, American footballer
 May 23 – John Requejo, American footballer
 May 24 – Frank Dolce, actor
 May 26 – Tyler Hilinski, American footballer (d. 2018)
 May 28 – Elizabeth Price, gymnast and alternate
 May 30
Erik Jones, race car driver
Kendall Sheffield, American footballer
 May 31 – Normani,  singer

June 

 June 2 – Jacy Jayne, pro wrestler
 June 7 – Christian McCaffrey, American football player
 June 10 – Raury, singer-songwriter
 June 11 – Kaleo Kanahele, volleyball player
 June 12
 Anna Margaret, singer, songwriter and actress
 Alissa Violet, social media personality
 June 16 – Lily Zhang, tennis player
 June 20 – Claudia Lee, actress, singer and songwriter
 June 25 – Lele Pons, YouTuber, singer

July 

 July 8 – Marlon Humphrey, football defensive back
 July 9 – Shanice Williams, actress and singer
 July 12
 Nick Dean, singer
 Jordan Romero, writer
 July 13 – Jena Irene Asciutto, singer
 July 15 – Trevor Stines, actor
 July 16
 Kevin Abstract, rapper, singer-songwriter and director
 Chayce Beckham, singer
 Nicky Jones, voice actor
 July 17 – Grace Fulton, actress
 July 20 – Joey Bragg, actor and comedian
 July 22 – Skyler Gisondo, actor
 July 23 
 Danielle Bradbery, singer 
 Rachel G. Fox, actress and singer
 David Dobrik, YouTuber
 July 24
 Cade Foehner, singer
 Joe Mixon, American football player
 July 25 – Princess Maria-Olympia of Greece and Denmark, daughter of Pavlos, Crown Prince of Greece
 July 27 – Ashlyn Sanchez, actress
 July 30
 Dylan Larkin, hockey player
 Jacob Lofland, actor
 Austin North, actor
 Yasmin Siraj, figure skater
 Marko Stunt, pro wrestler
 Angela Wang, figure skater
 July 31 – Blake Michael, actor

August

 August 1 – Cymphonique Miller, actress and singer
 August 2 – Simone Manuel, swimmer 
 August 3 – Derwin James, American football player
 August 6 – Merrell Twins, YouTubers
 August 10 – Jacob Latimore, actor, singer, and rapper
 August 14 – Brianna Hildebrand, actress
 August 16 – Caeleb Dressel, swimmer
 August 21 – Jamia Simone Nash, singer and actress
 August 22 – Michael Graue, actor
 August 25 – Naelee Rae, actress and singer
 August 30 – Trevor Jackson, actor, writer, singer and dancer

September 

 September 1 – Zendaya, actress, singer and dancer
 September 6 – Lil Xan, rapper
 September 12 – Colin Ford, actor
 September 10 – Mordechai Dov Brody, notable euthanasia patient (d. 2008)
 September 13 
 Playboi Carti, rapper
 Lili Reinhart, actress
 September 15 – Jake Cherry, actor
 September 18
 Kurt Doss, actor
 C. J. Sanders, actor
 September 19 – Royce Rodriguez, rapper
 September 26 – Jaelin Kauf, freestyle skier

October
 October 3 – Adair Tishler, actress, model and singer
 October 4 – Ryan Lee, actor
 October 9 – Jacob Batalon, actor
 October 12 – Paulie Koch, wakeboarder
 October 18 – Dorian McMenemy, swimmer
 October 23 – Sam Berns, high school student with progeria and documentary subject (died 2014)
 October 24 – Kyla Ross, gymnast
 October 25 – Keean Johnson, actor and dancer
 October 28
 Jasmine Jessica Anthony, actress
 Jack Eichel, professional ice hockey player
 Naelee Rae, actress and singer
 October 29 – Hannah Miller, figure skater

November 

 November 3 – Aria Wallace, actress and singer
 November 4 – Kaitlin Hawayek, ice dancer
 November 7 – Nairo, gamer
 November 11 – Tye Sheridan, actor
 November 13 – Austin Williams, actor
 November 14 
 Sarah Finnegan, artistic gymnast
 Mark L. Smith, pianist
 November 15 – Malik Jefferson, American football player
 November 18 
Christian Kirk, American football player
Noah Ringer, actor and martial arts practitioner
 November 19
 FaZe Rug, YouTuber
 RiceGum, YouTuber
 November 22 
 Hailey Baldwin, model and socialite
Madison Davenport, actress and singer
Mackenzie Lintz, actress
JuJu Smith-Schuster, American football player
 November 23 – Lia Marie Johnson, actress and Internet personality

December 

 December 2 - Deestroying, Costa Rican youtuber
 December 6 – Stefanie Scott, actress and singer
 December 8 – Teala Dunn, actress
 December 9 – Mykayla Skinner, artistic gymnast
 December 10 – Joe Burrow, American football player
 December 11 – Hailee Steinfeld, actress
 December 12 – Jeff Gladney, American football player (died 2022)
 December 13 – Gabrielle Andrews, tennis player
 December 17 – Nadhir Nasar, Malaysian actor
 December 21 – Kaitlyn Dever, actress
 December 27 – Jae Head, actor
 December 29 – Dylan Minnette, actor and musician
 December 30 – Sabrina Sobhy, squash player

Full date unknown
 Grizzly 399, bear
 Ahmed Siddiqui, kidnap victim
 David Steinberg, crossword constructor and editor

Deaths

 January 1 – Arleigh Burke, naval officer (b. 1901)
 January 5 – Lincoln Kirstein, director and producer (b. 1907)
 January 28
Joseph Brodsky, poet, recipient of the Nobel Prize in Literature in 1987 and Poet Laureate of the U.S. from 1991 to 1992 (b. 1940 in the Soviet Union)
Hal Smith, actor (b. 1916)
 February 2 – Gene Kelly, singer, actor, dancer, choreographer and director (b. 1912)
 February 3 – Audrey Meadows, television actress (b. 1922)
 February 6 – Guy Madison, television actor (b. 1922)
 February 7 – Phillip Davidson, general (b. 1915)
 February 13 – Martin Balsam, character actor, died in Rome, Italy (b. 1919)
 February 15
 Tommy Rettig, American actor (b. 1941)
 McLean Stevenson, American actor (b. 1927)
 February 16
 Roger Bowen, comedic screen actor and novelist (b. 1932)
 Pat Brown, politician, Governor of California (b. 1905)
 Brownie McGhee, African American Piedmont blues singer-guitarist (b. 1915)
 March 9 – George Burns, comedian (b. 1896)
 March 10
 Ross Hunter, film producer (b. 1926)
 Butch Laswell, motorcycle stunt rider (b. 1958)
 March 11 – Vince Edwards, screen actor (b. 1928)
 March 26
 Edmund Muskie, politician, 58th U.S. Secretary of State from 1980 to 1981 (b. 1914)
 David Packard, electrical engineer (b. 1912)
 March 31 – Jeffrey Lee Pierce, cowpunk singer-songwriter-guitarist (b. 1958)
 April 6 – Greer Garson, film actress (b. 1904 in the United Kingdom)
 May 1 – David M. Kennedy, politician and businessman (b. 1905)
 May 2 – Queen Mother Moore, African American civil rights leader (b. 1898)
 May 3 – Jack Weston, actor (b. 1924)
 May 31 – Timothy Leary, social activist (b. 1920)
 June 12 – Lillian Yarbo, African American actress, singer and dancer (b. 1905)
 June 15 – Ella Fitzgerald, African American jazz singer (b. 1917)
 June 19 
 Cordelia E. Cook, soldier and nurse (b. 1919)
 Kay Rhodes, bridge player (b. 1910) 
 G. David Schine, soldier and businessman (b. 1927)
 June 27 – Merze Tate, African American academic (b. 1905)
 July 1 – Margaux Hemingway, fashion model, actress, granddaughter of Ernest Hemingway (b. 1954)
 July 6 – Kathy Ahern, golfer (b. 1949)
 July 23 – Jean Muir, film actress (b. 1911)
 July 28 – Roger Tory Peterson, naturalist and artist (b. 1908)
 July 30 – Claudette Colbert, film actress (b. 1903 in France)
 September 12 - Ricardo López - the "Björk stalker", committed suicide by revolver after sending a Sulphuric acid-filled letter bomb to Björk (b. 1975)
 September 13
Tupac Shakur, rapper and murder victim (b. 1971)
Leni Wylliams, African-American dancer/choreographer/master-teacher (b. 1961)
 September 14
 Helen Cohan, dancer and actress (b. 1910)
 Juliet Prowse, dancer and actress (b. 1936)
 September 15 – Ottis Toole, murderer (b. 1947)
 September 16 – Gene Nelson, dancer and actor (b. 1920)
 September 17 – Spiro T. Agnew, 39th Vice President of the United States from 1969 to 1973 (b. 1918)
 September 22 – Dorothy Lamour, film actress (b. 1914)
 October 5 – Seymour Cray, computer scientist (b. 1925)
 October 6 – Ted Bessell, television actor (b. 1935)
 October 8 – Mignon G. Eberhart, mystery author (b. 1899)
 October 14 – Laura La Plante, actress (b. 1904)
 October 18 – Jason Bernard, actor (b. 1938)
 October 28 – Morey Amsterdam, comic actor (b. 1908)
 November 2 – Eva Cassidy, jazz/blues singer-guitarist (b. 1963)
 November 5 – Eddie Harris, jazz saxophonist (b. 1934)
 November 15 – Alger Hiss, diplomat and perjurer (b. 1904)
 November 22 – Mark Lenard, television actor (b. 1924)
 November 26 – Paul Rand, graphic designer (b. 1914)
 November 27 – Gertrude Blanch, mathematician (b. 1897)
 November 28 – Don McNeill, tennis player (b. 1918)
 November 30 – Tiny Tim, falsetto singer and ukulele player (b. 1932)
 December 6 – Pete Rozelle, American football official (b. 1926)
 December 8 – Howard Rollins, African American actor (b. 1950)
 December 18 – Irving Caesar, lyricist (b. 1895)
 December 20 – Carl Sagan, cosmologist (born 1934)
 December 28 – Lyman S. Ayres II, businessman (b. 1908)
 December 30 
 Lew Ayres, screen actor (b. 1908)
 Jack Nance, screen actor (b. 1943)

See also 
 1996 in American soccer
 1996 in American television
 List of American films of 1996
 Timeline of United States history (1990–2009)

References

External links
 

 
1990s in the United States
United States
United States
Years of the 20th century in the United States